The rufous-sided warbling finch (Poospizopsis hypochondria) is a species of bird in the family Thraupidae. It is found in the Southern Andean Yungas of Argentina and Bolivia. Its natural habitat is subtropical or tropical high-altitude shrubland.

Gallery

References

rufous-sided warbling finch
Birds of the Southern Andean Yungas
rufous-sided warbling finch
Taxonomy articles created by Polbot
Taxobox binomials not recognized by IUCN